The State Register of Heritage Places is maintained by the Heritage Council of Western Australia. , 53 places are heritage-listed in the Shire of Sandstone, of which three are on the State Register of Heritage Places.

List
The Western Australian State Register of Heritage Places, lists the following three state registered places within the Shire of Sandstone:

References

Sandstone
Sandstone
Shire of Sandstone